The SWM auto brand or Speedy Working Motors automotive brand (斯威汽车) was launched on July 27, 2016, after the Shineray Group purchased the SWM (motorcycles) brand in 2014. The SWM Design Center was established in Milan, Italy while the production line was set up in Chongqing, China.

History
The resurgence of the SWM brand started with six new models displayed at EICMA 2014 with funding for the company coming from China via the entity Shineray Group. SWM will keep manufacturing motorcycles in Italy with some of its engines acquired from the old Husqvarna (engines replaced by KTM units following the acquisition by Peirer). Shineray Group later revealed the SWM Automotive brand in 2016 in Beijing, China and launched the first product, the 7-seater SWM X7 midsize crossover shortly after.

Current Models
SWM Tiger
SWM G01
SWM G05
SWM X7
SWM X3
SWM X2
SWM X30L EV

References

External links
 

Vehicle manufacturing companies established in 2016
Car manufacturers of China
Chinese brands
Chinese companies established in 2016
Manufacturing companies based in Chongqing